Cementon is a hamlet and census-designated place (CDP) in the town of Catskill in Greene County, New York, United States. It was first listed as a CDP prior to the 2020 census.

The community is in the southeastern corner of Greene County, bordered to the east by the Hudson River and to the south by the town of Saugerties in Ulster County. U.S. Route 9W forms the western edge of the community, leading north  to Catskill village and south  to Saugerties village.

Demographics

References 

Census-designated places in Greene County, New York
Census-designated places in New York (state)